Harriet Tubman Press (HTP) is an imprint of TSEHAI Publishers established in August 2016 while housed at Loyola Marymount University (LMU) in Los Angeles. The press was created to be a "new source for African-American literature and academic works". HTP publishes works which represent African-American voices in the United States and throughout the globe, focusing on "uncovering hidden narratives". The press emphasizes publishing African-American literature and scholarship.

History and mission 
The Harriet Tubman Press was established in the Marymount Institute for Faith, Culture, and the Arts at Loyola Marymount University to publish academic work and literature as well as stories from African-American communities. The press is "a forum for hidden narratives to be uncovered and for academic and creative works to be published on underrepresented and misrepresented communities".

Elias Wondimu, editor and founder of HTP's family publishing house TSEHAI Publishers, of which HTP is an imprint, said Harriet Tubman was the chosen namesake "because she is an example for those fighting for an equal and just society" and added that HTP is a publishing house for "both established and up-and-coming literary writers and scholars".

Publications 
 Voices from Leimert Park: Redux: A Los Angeles Poetry Anthology, edited by Shonda Buchanan
 One Sunday in Mississippi: A One Act Play, by Linda Bannister and James E. Hurd, Jr.

Media Highlights 
 LMU Newsroom - a New Source for African-American Literature
 Cision PR Newswire - LMU's TSEHAI Publishers Launches Harriet Tubman Press for African-American Literature
 Publishers Weekly - L.A. Pub Unveils New Imprint Honoring Harriet Tubman
 Los Angeles Sentinel - Loyola Marymount Launches the Harriet Tubman Press
 Angelus - Harriet Tubman Press will be new source for African American literature
 Southern California Public Radio - Harriet Tubman Press wants to free African-American academic, literary work
 Tadias Magazine - Tsehai Launches Harriet Tubman Press
 Congressional Record - Honoring The Harriet Tubman Press Imprint
 Black Cultural Events - 'Voices From Leimert Park Redux' Book Launch - Harriet Tubman Press
 Roland S. Martin - We stumbled upon the Harriet Tubman Press launch in Leimert Park in LA.
 Los Angeles Review of Books - Reflection on the Launch of TSEHAI's Harriet Tubman Press Inaugural Book
 '''CISION PR Newswire - 'Voices of Leimert Park: Redux' Celebrated as Harriet Tubman Press' First Volume
 LMU This Week - "Voices From Leimert Park: Redux" Is Celebrated as Harriet Tubman Press' First Volume
 L.A. BIZ - 'Voices of Leimert Park: Redux' Celebrated as Harriet Tubman Press' First Volume
 Ethiopia Online - Loyola Marymount University and TSEHAI Publishers have officially launched the Harriet Tubman Press, a new source for African-American literature and academic works.
 Immigrant Magazine Online - Xenophobia on the Mind: Bridging the Gap Between African-American Perceptions and Immigrant Experiences
NewsOne Now - TSEHAI Publishers Celebrates 20 Years, Launches First Book Under Harriet Tubman Press Imprint

References 

African-American literature
Loyola Marymount University
Educational publishing companies of the United States
Publishing companies based in California
Publishing companies established in 2007
Harriet Tubman